= Evo-Stik League =

Evo-Stik League may refer to two English association football leagues sponsored by Evo-Stik:

- Northern Premier League, referred to as the Evo-Stik League Northern Premier
- Southern Football League, referred to as the Evo-Stik League Southern
